A constitutional referendum was held in Poland on 25 May 1997. Voters were asked whether they approved of a new constitution. It was narrowly approved, with 53.5% voting in favour (22,58% of Voters with right to vote, voting for "yes"). Voter turnout was just 42.9%. Although the 1995 Referendum Act stated that a 50% turnout was required to validate the referendum, the Supreme Court ruled on 15 July that the constitution could be introduced.

Question

Results

References

1997 referendums
1997 in Poland
History of Poland (1989–present)
Referendums in Poland
Constitutional referendums
May 1997 events in Europe